Yuval Diskin (born June 11, 1956) was the 12th Director of the Israeli Internal Security Service Shabak (frequently referred to in English as the "Shin Bet") from 2005 to 2011. He was appointed by Prime Minister Ariel Sharon, and later served under subsequent Prime Ministers Ehud Olmert and Benjamin Netanyahu.

Early life and education
Diskin was born in Givatayim. In 1974 he joined the Israel Defense Forces, and served as deputy company commander of Sayeret Shaked, the command Sayeret of the Israeli Southern Command. Diskin obtained a bachelor's degree in Israeli Studies and political science from Bar Ilan University, and a master's degree in political science and public administration from the University of Haifa.

Career in the secret service, 1978-2011
In 1978, following his mandatory military service, Diskin joined the Shabak and in the following years served in several operational positions in the Nablus district in the Israeli-occupied West Bank, and in Beirut and Sidon during the 1982 Lebanon War. In 1984 he was appointed head of operations in the Nablus district and by 1989, the Jenin and Tulkarm districts, also in the northern West Bank. During this time he was in charge of gathering and analyzing intelligence on the activities of terrorist groups in the area, and performing operations based on this intelligence.

In 1990, he was appointed head of department in Shabak's Counter Terrorism Division, which was responsible for the collection and analysis of intelligence and carrying out operations based on information received. In 1993 he was entrusted, by Prime Minister Yitzhak Rabin and then-director general of the Shabak Yaakov Peri, to establish ties with the Palestinian security forces as part of the Oslo Peace Accord. In 1994, he became the overall head of the Intelligence and Counter Terrorism Division and Counter Intelligence Division.

In 1997, Diskin was appointed commander of the Jerusalem District. During his tenure, the Shabak developed sophisticated operating methods, advanced technological and data mining capabilities, and by implementing them was able to debilitate Hamas's military wing in the West Bank, which led to a major decline in  the number of terrorist and suicide attacks in Israel.  From 2000 to 2003, as the Shabak's Deputy Director, he implemented the use of advanced technological methods and operational doctrines. During the time of the Second Intifada, Diskin led the Shabak's activities in the field of counter-terrorism, developing operational capabilities and countermeasures against the suicide attacks, that had cost hundreds of lives. He also developed the doctrine of "Command and Control Operation Centers" (CCOC), in which he established a combined intelligence gathering, analysis and implementation process between the Shabak and different intelligence and security bodies in order to produce more accurate, actionable intelligence.

In 2003, during a sabbatical, he became special advisor to Mossad Director, Meir Dagan. During this time he established a methodology for the Mossad's new operational tactics.

On May 15, 2005, he was appointed by Prime Minister Ariel Sharon to replace Avi Dichter as the Director of the Shabak. In 2006, the Shabak's major concerns were suicide attacks, obtaining highly accurate intelligence, and assessing the situation in regards to the elections in the Palestinian Legislative Council. Diskin and the Shabak were among the few people in the Israeli security forces who predicted Hamas winning the elections. Later that year, Diskin warned about the increasing rate of smuggling in the Philadelphi Route, which was under Egyptian control, and stated that in two years the Gaza strip would become a "Lebanon". In accordance, the Shabak focused on improving its technological, operational and intelligence-gathering capabilities at the Egyptian border.

Diskin publicly objected to the prisoner exchange in which Gilad Shalit was released. He iterated that his objection was based on the perception that this sort of exchange encourages the kidnapping of soldiers and civilians, strengthens the terrorist infrastructure in the long term, and weakens Israel's deterrence capabilities.

During his tenure as Director, Diskin led the development of the Shabak's cyber capabilities. These counter-cyberterrorism capabilities are both offensive—preventing terrorist and suicide attacks to the point of their termination in Israel, as well as defensive, as in protecting Israel's essential infrastructure, such as electricity, transport, telecommunications and banking. He also championed a revision in Israel's Counter Cyber Threats Authority, transforming it from a purely regulatory body to an active body, which works toward identifying and preventing cyber attacks.

In 2009, in an unusual act, the Israeli Prime Minister Binyamin Netanyahu requested Diskin to extend his service, due to his integral and unique role in maintaining the national security of Israel.

On May 15, 2011, Diskin was replaced as Director by his former deputy, Yoram Cohen.

Career since 2011
In 2011, Diskin co-founded with the former head of operational technologies department and the former head of the IT department in the Shabak, a high-tech cyber security company, where he serves as chairman. The company offers cyber security solutions for major multinational corporations.

In February 2015, Avi Primor, ex ambassador to Germany, introduced Diskin as the head of Diskin Advanced Technologies to Ferdinand Piëch, VW-CEO "as a favor". As a result of the meeting Diskin and Piëch founded a company named Cymotive Technologies in Herzliya, with 40% ownership through VW´s AutoVision, and 60% by Diskin Advanced Technologies, to close cybersecurity gaps of linked cars. Primor told Piëch about the impending dieselgate.

Views and opinions
In January 2013, prior to Israel's parliamentary elections, Diskin harshly criticized Binyamin Netanyahu´s leadership.

Diskin, along with former Mossad Director Meir Dagan and former IDF Chief of Staff Gabi Ashkenazi, have been highly critical of the diplomatic positions of Prime Minister Netanyahu's coalition; since his retirement from the Shabak, he has spoken on a number of occasions on his view of the need for diplomatic progress vis-à-vis the Palestinian Authority and the wider Arab world.

Personal life
Diskin is married to Dr. Isabel Arend Diskin, Cognitive Neuroscience researcher in Ben-Gurion University.

Honors
In 2012, Diskin was selected by Foreign Policy magazine as one of the Top 100 Global Thinkers for his standout contribution to the intellectual debate of foreign policy.

In 2012, Diskin, along with the other living former directors of the Shabak, was featured in a documentary film, The Gatekeepers in which he discussed some of the main events of his tenure in the Shabak and identified as a fluent speaker of Palestinian Arabic.

References

External links
Yuval Diskin, Official Facebook page
 Yuval Diskin, Shabak website. 
 Yuval Diskin, The Gatekeepers website. 
 Ex-Israeli Security Chief Diskin: 'All the Conditions Are There for an Explosion', Der Spiegel, July 24, 2014.
 Yuval Diskin Speech to Geneva Initiative 10 Year Conference, December 4, 2013.
 Diskin's speech in HLA International Conference, 2012.
 Foreign Policy magazine: Top 100 Global Thinkers list for 2012 full of Israelis.
 IPRED III Keynote Lecture Yuval Diskin.
 The Gatekeepers (2012) - People Expect A Decision

Directors of the Shin Bet
People from Givatayim
University of Haifa alumni
Bar-Ilan University alumni
1956 births
Living people